Jeremy Clarkson: Meets the Neighbours is a television series presented by Jeremy Clarkson. During the course of the series, he drives a 1960s Jaguar E-Type around six European countries. 

The show was first shown during 24 May 2002 to 21 June 2002 on BBC Two. Over the series, Clarkson drives around 20,000 miles visiting six European countries to discover just how different their lifestyles are to those in Britain, and whether the reality matches the stereotypical perception of each country. The show was produced by BBC Birmingham and executively produced by Richard Pearson. Meet The Neighbours was the second of two series involving Clarkson which were filmed during his hiatus from Top Gear, and his fifth documentary series for the BBC, following Motorworld, Extreme Machines, Car Years and Speed. The show was first shown on UK television channel BBC Two, before being shown to an international audience on BBC World. As of 2008, it has regularly been repeated on various UKTV channels, most recently being Dave. 30-minute versions of each episode have also been aired.

Episode list

References

BBC television documentaries
BBC World News shows
2002 British television series debuts
2002 British television series endings
2000s British documentary television series